This listing of flight altitude records are the records set for the highest aeronautical flights conducted in the atmosphere, set since the age of ballooning.

Some, but not all of the records were certified by the non-profit international aviation organization, the Fédération Aéronautique Internationale (FAI). One reason for a lack of 'official' certification was that the flight occurred prior to the creation of the FAI.

For clarity, the "Fixed-wing aircraft" table is sorted by FAI-designated categories as determined by whether the record-creating aircraft left the ground by its own power (category "Altitude"), or whether it was first carried aloft by a carrier-aircraft prior to its record setting event (category "Altitude gain", or formally "Altitude Gain, Aeroplane Launched from a Carrier Aircraft"). Other sub-categories describe the airframe, and more importantly, the powerplant type (since rocket-powered aircraft can have greater altitude abilities than those with air-breathing engines).

An essential requirement for the creation of an "official" altitude record is the employment of FAI-certified observers present during the record-setting flight. Thus several records noted are unofficial due to the lack of such observers.

Balloons 

 1783-08-15: ; Jean-François Pilâtre de Rozier of France, the first ascent in a hot-air balloon.
 1783-10-19: ; Jean-François Pilâtre de Rozier, in Paris.
 1783-10-19: ; Jean-François Pilâtre de Rozier with André Giroud de Villette, in Paris.
 1783-11-21: ; Jean-François Pilâtre de Rozier with Marquis d'Arlandes, in Paris. 
 1783-12-01: ; Jacques Alexandre Charles and his assistant Marie-Noël Robert, both of France, made the first flight in a hydrogen balloon to about 610 m. Charles then ascended alone to the record altitude.
 1784-06-23: ; Pilâtre de Rozier and the chemist Joseph Proust in a Montgolfier.
 1803-07-18: ; Étienne-Gaspard Robert and Auguste Lhoëst in a balloon.
 1839: ; Charles Green and Spencer Rush in a free balloon.
 1901-07-31: ; Arthur Berson and Reinhard Süring in the hydrogen balloon Preußen, in an open basket and with oxygen in steel cylinders. This flight contributed to the discovery of the stratosphere.
 1927-11-04: ; Captain Hawthorne C. Gray, of the U.S. Army Air Corps, in a helium balloon. Gray lost consciousness after his oxygen supply ran out and was killed in the crash.
 1931-05-27: ; Auguste Piccard and Paul Kipfer in a hydrogen balloon.
 1932:  -Auguste Piccard and Max Cosyns in a hydrogen balloon.
 1933-09-30: ; USSR balloon USSR-1.
 1933-11-20: ; Lt. Comdr. Thomas G. W. Settle (USN) and Maj Chester L. Fordney (USMC) in Century of Progress balloon
 1934-01-30: ; USSR balloon Osoaviakhim-1. The three crew were killed when the balloon broke up during the descent.
 1935-11-10: ; Captain O. A. Anderson and Captain A. W. Stevens (U.S. Army Air Corps) ascended in the Explorer II gondola from the Stratobowl, near Rapid City, South Dakota, for a flight that lasted 8 hours 13 minutes and covered .
 1957-06-02: ; Captain Joseph W. Kittinger (U.S. Air Force) ascended in the Project Manhigh 1 gondola to a record-breaking altitude.
 1957-08-19: ; above sea level, Major David Simons (U.S. Air Force) ascended from the Portsmouth Mine near Crosby, Minnesota in the Manhigh 2 gondola for a 32-hour record-breaking flight. Simons landed at 5:32 p.m. on August 20 in northeastern South Dakota.
He set world records for: high-altitude jump; freefall diving by falling  before opening his parachute; and fastest speed achieved by a human without motorized assistance, .
 1961-05-04: ; Commander Malcolm D. Ross and Lieutenant Commander Victor A. Prather, Jr., of the U.S. Navy ascended in the Strato-Lab V, in an unpressurized gondola. After descending, the gondola containing the two balloonists landed in the Gulf of Mexico. Prather slipped off the rescue helicopter's hook into the gulf and drowned.
 1966-02-02: ; Amateur parachutist Nicholas Piantanida of the United States with his "Project Strato-Jump" II balloon. Because he was unable to disconnect his oxygen line from the gondola's main feed, the ground crew had to remotely detach the balloon from the gondola. His planned free fall and parachute jump was abandoned, and he returned to the ground in the gondola. Nick was unable to accomplish his desired free fall record, however his spectacular flight set other records that held up for 46 years. Because of the design of his glove, he was unable to reattach his safety seat belt harness. He endured incredible g-forces, but survived the descent. Piantanida's ascent is not recognized by the Fédération Aéronautique Internationale as a balloon altitude world record, because he did not return with his balloon, although that was not the feat he was trying to accomplish. On this second attempt of "Project Strato-Jump", Nick Piantanida took with him 250 postmarked air-mail envelopes and letters. At the time, these letters were the first covers to have ever been delivered by the U.S. Post Office via space. The habit of bringing cover letters in to space continued with the Apollo Program. In fact, in 1972 there was a Scandal involving the Apollo 15 Astronauts. It is unclear if any of the "Project Strato-Jump" covers survived, and were eventually mailed to the intended recipients.
 2012-10-14: ; Felix Baumgartner in the Red Bull Stratos balloon.  The flight started near Roswell, New Mexico, and returned to earth via a record-setting parachute jump.
 2014-10-24: ; Alan Eustace, a senior vice president at the Google corporation, in a helium balloon, returning to earth via parachute jump during the StratEx mission executed by Paragon Space Development Corporation.

Hot-air balloons

Uncrewed gas balloon 
During 1893 French scientist Jules Richard constructed sounding balloons.

During 2002 an ultra-thin-film balloon named BU60-1 made of polyethylene film 3.4 µm thick with a volume of 60,000 m³ was launched from Sanriku Balloon Center at Ofunato City, Iwate in Japan at 6:35 on May 23, 2002.

This was the greatest height a flying object reached without using rockets or a launch with a cannon.

Gliders 

The flight was accomplished using the Grob 102 Standard Astir III.

This was surpassed at  set on August 30, 2006 by Steve Fossett (pilot) and Einar Enevoldson (co-pilot) in their high performance research glider Perlan 1, a modified Glaser-Dirks DG-500. This record was achieved over El Calafate (Patagonia, Argentina) and set as part of the Perlan Project.

This record was again achieved over El Calafate and as part of the Perlan Project.

On September 2, 2018, within the Airbus Perlan Mission II, again from El Calafate, the Perlan II piloted by Jim Payne and Tim Gardner reached , surpassing the  attained by Jerry Hoyt on April 17, 1989 in a Lockheed U-2: the highest subsonic flight.

Fixed-wing aircraft

Piston-driven propeller aeroplane 
It was obtained during 1988–1989 by the Boeing Condor UAV.

Jet aircraft 
The highest current world absolute general aviation altitude record  for air breathing jet-propelled aircraft is  set by Aleksandr Vasilyevich Fedotov, in a Mikoyan Gurevich  E-266M (MiG-25M), on August 31, 1977.

Rocket plane 
The record for highest altitude obtained by a crewed rocket-powered aircraft is the US Space Shuttle (STS) which regularly reached altitudes of more than 500 km (310 mi) on servicing missions to the Hubble Space Telescope.

The SpaceShipOne was launched at over 43,500 ft (13.3 km). 

The previous (unofficial) record was  set by Joseph A. Walker in a North American X-15 in mission X-15 Flight 91 on August 22, 1963. Walker had reached 106 km – crossing the Kármán line the first time – with X-15 Flight 90 the previous month. 

During the X-15 program, 8 pilots flew a combined 13 flights which met the Air Force spaceflight criterion by exceeding the altitude of 50 miles (80 km), qualifying these pilots as being astronauts; of those 13 flights, two (flown by the same civilian pilot) met the FAI definition (100 kilometres (62 mi)) of outer space.

Mixed power

The official record for a mixed power aircraft was achieved on May 2, 1958 by Roger Carpentier when he reached  over Istres, France in a Sud-Ouest Trident II mixed power (turbojet & rocket engine) aircraft. 

Electrically powered aircraft 
This is also the altitude record for propeller driven aircraft, FAI class U (Experimental / New Technologies), and FAI class U-1.d (Remotely controlled UAV : Weight 500 kg to less than 2500 kg).

Rotorcraft 
At that extreme altitude, the engine flamed out and Boulet had to land the helicopter by breaking another record: the longest successful autorotation in history. 
The helicopter was stripped of all unnecessary equipment prior to the flight to minimize weight, and the pilot breathed supplemental oxygen.

Paper airplanes 
The project achieved a Guinness world record recognition.

This record was broken on 24 June 2015 in Cambridgeshire, UK by the Space Club of Kesgrave High School, Suffolk, as part of their Stratos III project.

Cannon rounds 
The projectile’s trajectory sent it beyond 100 km (62.14 mi), making it the first cannon-fired projectile to do so.

The Paris Gun (German: Paris-Geschütz) was a German long-range siege gun used to bombard Paris during World War I. It was in service from March–August 1918.

See also 
 Fédération Aéronautique Internationale
 High-altitude balloon
 High-altitude military parachuting
 High-altitude platform station

Notes

References

Bibliography 
 Andrews, C.F. and E.B. Morgan. Vickers Aircraft since 1908. London:Putnam, 1988. .
 Angelucci, Enzo and Peter M. Bowers. The American Fighter. Sparkford, UK:Haynes Publishing Group, 1987. .
 Bridgman, Leonard. Jane's All The World's Aircraft 1951–52. London: Sampson Low, Marston & Company, Ltd, 1951.
 "Eighteen Years of World's Records". Flight, February 7, 1924, pp. 73–75.
 Lewis, Peter. British Racing and Record-Breaking Aircraft. London:Putnam, 1971. .
 Owers, Colin. "Stop-Gap Fighter:The LUSAC Series". Air Enthusiast, Fifty, May to July 1993. Stamford, UK:Key Publishing. ISSN 0143-5450. pp. 49–51.
 Taylor, John W. R. Jane's All The World's Aircraft 1965–66. London:Sampson Low, Marston & Company, 1965.
 "The Royal Aero Club of the U.K.: Official Notices to Members". Flight December 16, 1920.

External links

Fédération Aéronautique Internationale  –the international, non-profit, non-government organization that tracks aircraft world records
Balloon World Records Fédération Aéronautique Internationale
Excelsior III Details of Kittingers' Jump from a stratospheric balloon in 1960
Iowa State University – High Altitude Balloon Experiments in Technology

Aviation records
Aviation-related lists
 
Highest things